"Histeria" is the sixth and last single of Argentine singer and actress Lali Espósito's debut studio album A Bailar (2014). It was released as a single on September 11, 2015. The song was written by Espósito along with music producers Pablo Akselrad, Luis Burgio and Gustavo Novello, and was produced by 3musica and Warner/Chappell Music.

Background and release
The track was released on March 21, 2014 as part of the entire album. On September 11, 2015, the song was released as an official single along with its music video.

Live performances
The song's first TV performance was on August 16, 2014 at the charity TV special Un Sol para los Chicos along with "A Bailar" and "No Estoy Sola". Histeria" was also performed at the 2015 Kids' Choice Awards Argentina on October 26, 2015, before performing "Mil Años Luz". On December 20, 2015, Espósito performed the song along with "A Bailar", "Tengo Esperanza" and "Cómo Haremos" at the tenth edition's season finale of Bailando por un Sueño Argentina. On February 21, 2016, Espósito performed the song at Laten Argentinos''' season premiere, along with "A Bailar" and "Mil Años Luz". "Histeria" is also part of Espósito's worldwide tour, A Bailar Tour'' setlist.

Music video
The video was released on Espósito's Vevo channel on September 11, 2015. Previously, Espósito had posted preview clips of the music video onto her YouTube channel before the music video release. The music video holds the record as the Argentine most viewed video in 24 hours with more than 306,000 views. The video was directed by Juan Ripari, who also directed all the previously music videos of Espósito.

Awards and nominations
The song was nominated in the category for "Best Pop Video" at the 2015 Quiero Awards.

References

2014 songs
Lali Espósito songs
2015 singles
Sony Music singles
Songs written by Gustavo Novello
Songs written by Pablo Akselrad
Songs written by Lali Espósito